Lee Williams and The Spiritual QC's was an American quartet gospel group originating from Tupelo, Mississippi which has been in existence since 1968. The group started recording around 1970. The gospel quartet included Lee Williams as lead singer, Al Hollis as guitarist and background vocal, Patrick Hollis as background singer, Leonard Shumpert as second lead vocalist, and new full-time bassist Tommie Harris. Lee Williams was the co-lead singer along with Willie Ligon.

Career
Lee Andrew Williams (July 28, 1946 – August 30, 2021)

Lee Williams and the Spiritual QC's went from being a part-time gospel group to recording artist of the year.  The group's first recordings were a series of 45 rpm records on the Designer label out of Memphis, Tennessee. The singles were usually one side led by Willie Ligon and the other by Lee Williams, who was principally the group bass guitarist. After Ligon's departure from the group, Williams took over lead duties and the group name changed to include his name in front. Their first national recording was in 1990 at the Georgia-based gospel label MCG Records. "Jesus Is Alive And Well" was their first album, which included the breakout hit record "I've Learned to Lean". Their second album, "Love Will Go All the Way", was released in 1998 which included a few songs from their first album and set the stage for their third album, released in 2000, named "Good Time". This reached the Top Ten of Billboards gospel albums chart in November.

During that following year the group won Traditional Quartet of the Year at the Gospel Music Excellence Awards, and was nominated for the Best Gospel Album at the Soul Train Music Awards. In 2002 the group recorded their fourth album titled "Right On Time" at The Temple Of Deliverance Church in Memphis, Tennessee. When recording finished, the album was released to the public in the spring of 2003. In 2005, they released their fifth album titled "Tell the Angels" in Memphis again. In 2006, they released a compilation of songs with the album's name being "Soulful Healing". In the 2000s they went to SoulLink Live! then the second one, then the third. In 2007, they released "So Much To Be Thankful For". They did a few other compilation albums including, " My Brother's Keeper", and "The Collection" in 2009. In 2009, they released their seventh actual album titled "Fall On Me". They let a member from the first two albums named Roger McKinney sing background vocals on one song called "Another Chance". In 2010, they released another compilation album titled " Through The Years". In 2011, they released their eighth actual album titled "Living On The Lord's Side" at the Greater Travelers Rest Baptist Church in Atlanta, Georgia, which again had songs from Jesus Is Alive And Well. It had a few songs from Good Time, and a few other songs from older albums that were re-recorded in updated versions. They let Willie Ligon sing one song called "Call Him". In 2015, they made their last album, another compilation titled "Memphis Gospel, Live!" 
  
For the rest of their singing time, they continued to travel 50 out of 52 weeks of the year. During that time Lee Williams battled with dementia. In 2018 Lee Williams announced his retirement from gospel music. Lee and the group went on their farewell tour, touring all over the country. Lee Williams retired from the group in 2018 and the group celebrated Lee Williams and the spiritual qc's celebrated there 54th anniversary and celebrated Lee's retirement on December 8th, 2018. Lee Williams is often refired to as the "goat" of gospel music and him and the qc's are often recognized how they change gospel quartet music and the impact they made also going on to be the number one gospel group in the world for 21 years straight. Lee Williams died on August 30, 2021. He was 75 years old. Williams' son (C.C. Williams) came aboard, and the group continues on as the Spiritual QC'S.

Albums
 Jesus Is Alive And Well (1996)
 Love Will Go All The Way (1998)
 Good Time (2000)
 Right On Time (2003)
 Tell The Angels (2005)
 Soulful Healing (2006)
 So Much To Be Thankful For (2007)
 The Collection (2009)
 Fall On Me (2009)
 Through The Years (2010)
 God's Groove! The Re-Mix (2011)
 Living On The Lord's Side (2011)
   Memphis Gospel, Live! (2015)

Other albums
 SoulLink Live
 Gospel gospel
 SoulLink Live 2
 SoulLink Live 3
 My Brother's Keeper (The Williams Brothers)
 Gospel Praise & Worship
 My Brother's Keeper 2 (The Williams Brothers)
 Love Will Go All The Way Deluxe Set

References

External links
 
 

1968 establishments in Mississippi
2021 disestablishments in Mississippi
American gospel musical groups
Musical groups from Mississippi
Musical groups established in 1968
Musical groups disestablished in 2021